Ankevalia is a village in Limbdi Taluka of Surendranagar district, Gujarat, India. It is about four miles north of Limbdi and ten miles north-east of Bhoika and nine miles south-east of Wadhwan.

History
It was a separate tribute paying state under the Bhoika thana during British period. The talukadars were Jhala Rajputs.

References

Cities and towns in Surendranagar district